Ross MacKenzie (18 July 1946 – 20 June 2002) was a Canadian sprinter. He competed in the men's 400 metres at the 1968 Summer Olympics. He finished second in the 1967 Pan American Games 4 × 400 metres relay (with Brian MacLaren, Bill Crothers, and Robert McLaren). MacKenzie also finished fifth in the 1967 Pan American Games 400 metres. He won a silver medal in the 1966 British Empire and Commonwealth Games 4 x 440 yards relay with Don Domansky, Brian MacLaren and Bill Crothers.

References

1946 births
2002 deaths
Athletes (track and field) at the 1968 Summer Olympics
Canadian male sprinters
Olympic track and field athletes of Canada
Athletes (track and field) at the 1967 Pan American Games
Pan American Games medalists in athletics (track and field)
Pan American Games silver medalists for Canada
Athletes (track and field) at the 1966 British Empire and Commonwealth Games
Commonwealth Games medallists in athletics
Commonwealth Games silver medallists for Canada
Place of birth missing (living people)
Medalists at the 1967 Pan American Games
Medallists at the 1966 British Empire and Commonwealth Games